This is a list of 116 species in the genus Macrodactylus, rose chafers.

Macrodactylus species

References

Macrodactylus